Magdalena Petit Marfán (1903 in Peñaflor, Chile – 1968) was a Chilean writer, notable for her popular novels La Quintrala, Los Pincheira and Los Hijos del Caleuche, inter alias. Also she wrote theater pieces, essays and biographies. She was a recipient of the Santiago Municipal Literature Award.

She died in 1968, because of an accidental fall at home.

External links 
Biography on Memoria Chilena 

Chilean people of French descent
1903 births
1968 deaths
20th-century Chilean women writers
Chilean women novelists
20th-century Chilean novelists